Ágnel José Flores Hernández (born 29 May 1989) is a Venezuelan international footballer who plays for Atlético Venezuela, as a midfielder.

Club career
Flores has played for Mineros de Guayana and AC Minervén.

For the new season 2012–13, Deportivo Táchira signed Flores on a 3-year contract.

International career
He made his international debut for Venezuela in 2010, and played at the 2009 FIFA U-20 World Cup.

References

External links

1989 births
Living people
Venezuelan footballers
Venezuela international footballers
A.C.C.D. Mineros de Guayana players
Minervén S.C. players
Deportivo Táchira F.C. players
Association football midfielders
People from Bolívar (state)
21st-century Venezuelan people